Desvignes is a French surname. Notable people with the surname include:

 Margot Desvignes
 Peter Hubert Desvignes
 Pierre Desvignes (1764–1827), French composer
 Thomas Desvignes (1812–1868), English entomologist
 Fabrice Desvignes (born 1972), French chef, winner of the 2007 Bocuse d'Or

See also
 Sidney Desvigne

French-language surnames